Sex, Lies, and Videotape (often written in all lowercase as sex, lies, and videotape) is a 1989 American independent drama film written and directed by Steven Soderbergh. The plot tells the story of a troubled man who videotapes women discussing their sexuality and fantasies, and his impact on the relationships of a troubled married couple and the wife's younger sister.

Sex, Lies, and Videotape won the Palme d'Or at the 1989 Cannes Film Festival, making Soderbergh the youngest solo director to win the award; he was 26 at the time. The film was influential in revolutionizing the independent film movement in the early 1990s. In 2006, Sex, Lies, and Videotape was added to the United States Library of Congress' National Film Registry, deemed "culturally, historically, or aesthetically significant".

Plot 
Ann Bishop Mullany lives in Baton Rouge, unhappily but comfortably married to John, a successful lawyer. She is in therapy, where she reveals that she is repulsed by the idea of John touching her. Graham Dalton, an old close college friend of John and now a drifter with some money saved up, visits Baton Rouge to see John and perhaps stay in the city. When he arrives at their home, Graham meets Ann, who learns that John has invited Graham to stay with them until he finds an apartment. When John arrives home, Graham's demeanor becomes remarkably more guarded; though he realizes he now has nothing in common with John, he and Ann get along well.

John is having an affair with Ann's sister Cynthia, a free-spirited artist and bartender, which he rationalizes by blaming Ann's frigidity. Ann helps Graham look for an apartment. After Graham finds a place, Ann makes an impromptu visit and notices stacks of camcorder videotapes, labeled with women's names. When questioned, Graham explains that they contain interviews with women about their  deepest desires and fantasies. Offended and confused, Ann abruptly leaves.

The next day, Cynthia appears uninvited at Graham's apartment and presses Graham to explain what "spooked" Ann. Graham reluctantly explains it was the videotapes that disturbed Ann and that he achieves gratification by watching the videos in private. Graham propositions Cynthia to make an interview tape, assuring her that only he will see them. She agrees, and later tells Ann about the experience. Ann is horrified, as is John when Cynthia later tells him.

Cleaning her home the next day, Ann discovers Cynthia's pearl earring in her bedroom while vacuuming, and deduces her affair with John. Furious, Ann goes to Graham's apartment with the intention of making a videotape. Graham objects, but she is insistent.

Later, Ann demands a divorce from John, and reveals that she made a tape with Graham. John rushes to Graham's apartment and, after attacking Graham and locking him out, watches Ann's tape. In the video, Ann says she has never felt any kind of "satisfaction" from sex.  Graham asks if she ever thinks of having sex with other men, she admits she has thought of Graham. Ann turns the camera on Graham, who resists opening up, but soon confesses that he is haunted by his ex-girlfriend Elizabeth, and that his motivation in returning to Baton Rouge was an attempt to achieve some closure. Graham explains that he was a pathological liar, which destroyed his relationship with Elizabeth. He has since gone to great lengths to avoid people and  relationships. Ann kisses Graham, then he turns off the camcorder, ending the tape.

A chastened John joins Graham on the front porch and, with obvious pleasure, confesses to having sex with Elizabeth while she and Graham were a couple, saying "She was no saint. She was good in bed, and she could keep a secret. That's all I can say about her". After he leaves, Graham angrily destroys his camcorder and all of the videotapes.

The next day, John is summoned to his boss's office, where it is implied that he is about to be fired. Ann and Cynthia reconcile at the bar Cynthia tends. Ann goes to Graham's and joins him on the front porch.

Cast 
 James Spader as Graham Dalton
 Andie MacDowell as Ann Bishop Mullany
 Peter Gallagher as John Mullany
 Laura San Giacomo as Cynthia Patrice Bishop
 Steven Brill as Barfly
 Ron Vawter as Therapist

Production 
The film was written by Steven Soderbergh in eight days on a yellow legal pad during a cross country trip (although, as Soderbergh points out in his DVD commentary track, he had been thinking about the film for a year).

Soderbergh's commentary also reveals that he had written Andie MacDowell's role with Elizabeth McGovern in mind, but McGovern's agent disliked the script so much that McGovern never even got to read it. Laura San Giacomo, who was represented by the same agency, had to threaten to leave that agency in order to be able to play Cynthia. Soderbergh was reluctant to audition MacDowell but she surprised him, getting the role after two extremely successful auditions. The role of John would have been played by Tim Daly, but delays in completing the financing for the film led to Peter Gallagher's getting the role instead.

With a budget of only $1.2 million, a week of rehearsal and a month-long shoot in August 1988 was all Soderbergh could afford. He would later call it “the only movie I’ve ever made where I felt like I had all the money and all the time I needed.” Principal photography took place in Baton Rouge, Louisiana.

Reception and legacy

Box office 
Sex, Lies, and Videotape opened in a limited release on August 4, 1989, in 4 theaters and grossed $155,982, with an average of 30 patrons per showing in the first 2–3 weeks; the studio released the film nationwide. The widest release for the film was 534 theaters and it ended up earning $24,741,667 in the United States, and around $36.74 million worldwide.

Critical response 
Sex, Lies, and Videotape was well received in its initial release in 1989 and holds a "certified fresh" rating of 96% on Rotten Tomatoes based on 52 reviews with an average score of 8.00/10. The consensus states "In his feature directorial debut, Steven Soderbergh demonstrates a mastery of his craft well beyond his years, pulling together an outstanding cast and an intelligent script for a nuanced, mature film about neurosis and human sexuality." The film also has a score of 86 out of 100 on Metacritic based on 17 reviews indicating 'universal acclaim'.

In 2006, Sex, Lies, and Videotape was selected for preservation in the United States National Film Registry by the Library of Congress as being deemed "culturally, historically, or aesthetically significant."

Accolades
At the 1989 Cannes Film Festival, the film won the Palme d'Or and the FIPRESCI Prize, with Spader getting the Best Actor Award. It also won an Audience Award at the Sundance Film Festival. Soderbergh was nominated for an Academy Award for his screenplay.

Home media 
The DVD includes a "director's dialogue" between Soderbergh and playwright/director Neil LaBute, recorded in 1998. LaBute's presence leads to conversational tangents unrelated to the film, although most of the tangents are related to the question of what it means to be a director, and are intended, as Soderbergh summarizes at the end, to "demystify" the process of making a film. LaBute's presence prompts Soderbergh to talk about reverse zooms, dolly shots, how actors have varying expectations of their director, the difference between stealing from a film you admire and paying tribute to it, shooting out of sequence, how the role of a director changes as their success (and their budgets) grow, and other filmmaking topics.

Adaptations 
The movie was presented as a staged play in Hollywood at the Next Stage from December 13, 2003 to January 17, 2004. Directed by Seth Wiley and a cast that featured Amanda Bauman (Ann), Emily Williams (Therapist), Shauna Slade (Cynthia), Justin Christenson (Graham), and Jack Sundmacher (John).

"An unofficial sequel of sorts" 
A sequel was announced in 2001 and Catherine Keener was the first actor attached to the project, named How to Survive a Hotel Room Fire. It was billed by Miramax as "an unofficial sequel of sorts." In October it was announced the movie would star Julia Roberts, David Hyde Pierce, and David Duchovny. After the September 11 attacks, the title was changed to The Art of Negotiating a Turn. Miramax head Harvey Weinstein did not like the new title, and consequently Soderbergh suggested the title, Full Frontal, under which the film was released.

References

External links 
 
 
 
 
 
sex, lies, and videotape: Some Kind of Skin Flick an essay by Amy Taubin at the Criterion Collection

1989 drama films
1989 films
Adultery in films
American drama films
American independent films
Films directed by Steven Soderbergh
Films set in Louisiana
Films shot in Louisiana
Independent Spirit Award for Best Film winners
Palme d'Or winners
Sundance Film Festival award winners
United States National Film Registry films
Films scored by Cliff Martinez
Films with screenplays by Steven Soderbergh
1989 independent films
1989 directorial debut films
1980s English-language films
1980s American films